The Castilian Party (PCAS), formerly the Party of Castile and León until 2011, is a Spanish political party resulting from the union of several Castilian nationalist and regionalist political parties from Castile and León, Madrid and Castile-La Mancha. The most relevant of the components is Tierra Comunera.

Ideology 
The Castilian Party wishes to be an alternative to the classic two-party system in Castile. They also state their support for Castilian historical heritage and the environment. From their foundational congress on 24 October 2009, in Toledo onwards, their ideology has been federalist and Castilian nationalist. For this reason, they intend to recover the dissolved sense of Castilian identity and to turn Castile into Spain's financial and political engine by overcoming Castilian endemic problems like depopulation, population aging, youth emigration, and despotism. All of said problems have been publicly denounced by the party. The party seeks to recover the political union of Castile as a single territory, which is currently split into five regions: Castile and León, Castile-La Mancha, Madrid, Cantabria and La Rioja.

History 
In July 2010, the party announced to run for the Catalan regional parliament election with the name of Castilian Party–Party of the Cultures of Catalonia.

In the Spanish general election 2011, the party ran for the election in association with the Cantabrian Regionalist Party.

Party split 

Since the party's creation, there were two very different political currents: one more official (which supported the union of the whole of Castile), and another much stronger in support to simpler regionalist ideas (which supported the political reality in force). During the party congress in October 2011, a majority of party members unanimously approved a new political strategy and changed the former name "Party of Castile and León" to simply the "Castilian Party". This initiative was promoted and supported by the party directorate and caused the regionalist current to quit the party. The splinter group decided to found a new party called the Regionalist Party of Castile and León (PRCAL).

Results

General elections

Cortes of Castile and León

Cortes of Castilla–La Mancha

Assembly of Madrid

Local elections

Notes

References

External links
Web del PCAS(in Spanish)
Web del PCAL(in Spanish)
Siete partidos regionales se unen en PCAL(in Spanish)
El Partido de Castilla y León (PCAL) presenta en Valladolid su gestora regional.(Marzo de 2009)(in Spanish)

Nationalist parties in Spain
Castilian nationalism
Castile (historical region)
Regionalist parties in Spain
Left-wing nationalist parties